Adley is a first and last name of English origin. Notable people with the surname Adley include:

 Robert Adley (1935–1993), British politician, MP for Bristol NE and later Christchurch
 Big Daddy Carlos (born 1968), American restaurant and night-club owner, birth-name Carlos Adley

See also 
 Adley Creek

References 

English-language surnames